North Yarra Province was an electorate of the Victorian Legislative Council, the upper house of the Victorian Parliament. 
It was created in the redistribution of provinces in 1882 when the original provinces of Central and Eastern were abolished. The new North Yarra, North Eastern, North Central, Melbourne East, Melbourne North, Melbourne South and Melbourne West Provinces were then created.

North Yarra consisted of the following divisions: Hotham North, Hotham South, Fitzroy North, St. Mark's, Fitzroy (East), Fitzroy (West), Darling Gardens, Glasshouse (North), Glasshouse (South), Abbotsford, Footscray, North Williamstown and South Williamstown.

North Yarra Province was abolished in the redistribution of 1904 when new provinces including Melbourne North Province and Melbourne East Province were created.

Members for North Yarra Province
Theodotus Sumner was transferred from the abolished Central Province.

References

Former electoral provinces of Victoria (Australia)
1882 establishments in Australia
1904 disestablishments in Australia